Itatiella ulei is a species of moss in the family Polytrichaceae.  It is the only species in the genus Itatiella. The Polytrichaceae is a common family of mosses that does not have close living relatives. Its small size and the inflexed leaf apex characterize Itatiella ulei. When this species grows directly exposed to sun at high elevations, it presents a similar aspect but can be distinguished based on the distal lamella cells which are single and rhombic.

Description
Itatiella ulei is dark green to brown 10-25mm long plant. Just like other moss, this plant divides into two parts, which are sporophyte and gametophyte. The stems are brown, straight and forming tufts. The rhizome is pale-brown and facing down on the ground. Leaves are 2.5-4.0mm long and oblong-lanceolate in shape. This plant has hexagonal-quadratic cells that are thick walled. This plant is dioicous which means gametophytes produce sperm or eggs but never both. The perichaetium that surrounds the archegonia and the base of the seta is terminal and their leaves are long. The perigonium that surrounds the antheridia is also terminal and their leaves are short and broad. Its small size and the inflexed leaf apex characterize Itatiella ulei. This species is growing directly exposed to sun at high elevations present a similar aspect but can be distinguished based on the distal lamella cells which are single and rhombic.

Sporophyte: The sporophytes are common, light brown with globose urns occurring on top of an erect, 5-10mm tall seta. The capsule is erect and symmetrical. The operculum is in a conic form. The operculum is equipped with long rostrate. The peristome teeth are absent so it is known as gymnostomous. The calyptra is hood-shaped and split on one side only, i.e. cucullate.

Distribution
Itatiella ulei is endemic to southeastern and southern Brazil. It can be found in some areas in the states of Espírito Santo, Minas Gerais, Paraná, Rio de Janeiro and São Paulo. The last one that it was found was in upper montane forests above 5,000 feet in elevation.

Ecology
Itatiella ulei can be found in growing on the soil at the margins of montane forest and high campos in the Bioma Mata Atlântica, between 900–2,890 m alt.

References
 Bisby, F.A., Y.R. Roskov, M.A. Ruggiero, T.M. Orrell, L.E. Paglinawan, P.W. Brewer, N. Bailly, J. van Hertum, eds (2007). Species 2000 & ITIS Catalogue of Life: 2007 Annual Checklist. Species 2000: Reading, U.K.
 Brands, S.J. (comp.) 1989-2005. Systema Naturae 2000. The Taxonomicon. Universal Taxonomic Services, Amsterdam, The Netherlands.  . Access date: May 13, 2011
 Gary L. Smith Merrill "Polytrichaceae". in Flora of North America Vol. 27 Page 24, 39, 116, 121, 122, 126, 156, 160. Oxford University Press. Online at EFloras.org. 
 Goffinet, B., W. R. Buck, and A. J. Shaw. 2009. Morphology, anatomy, and classification of the Bryophyta. Pages 56–138. In: Goffinet, B. and A. J. Shaw. (eds.). Bryophyte Biology. Cambridge University Press. Cambridge.
 Messmer, L. and T. C. Frye. 1947. The Polytrichum group between South America and the United States. The Bryologist 50:259–268.
 Gradstein, S. R., S. P. Churchill, and N. Salazar-Allen. (eds.). 2001. Guide to the Bryophytes to Tropical America. Memoirs of The New York Botanical Garden 86:1–577.
 Crosby, M. R., R. E. Magill, B. Allen, and S. He. 1999. A Checklist of the Mosses. Missouri Botanical Garden. St. Louis.
 Crum, H. and L. E. Anderson. 1981. Mosses Eastern North America, vol. 2. Columbia University Press. New York.
 Peralta, Denilson Fernandes, and Olga Yano. "Taxonomic Treatment of the Polytrichaceae from Brazil." The Bryologist 113.3. BioOne. Web. 13 May 2011. <http://www.bioone.org/doi/full/10.1639/0007-2745-113.3.646>.

External links
Endangered Plants Profile at Endangered Plants 

Monotypic moss genera
Polytrichaceae
Flora of Brazil